The 1992 Basildon District Council election took place on 7 May 1992 to elect members of Basildon District Council in Essex, England. This was on the same day as other local elections. One third of the council was up for election; the seats which were last contested in 1988. The Conservative Party won every seat up for election, and gained control of the council for the first time, which had previous been under no overall control.

Overall results

|-
| colspan=2 style="text-align: right; margin-right: 1em" | Total
| style="text-align: right;" | 15
| colspan=5 |
| style="text-align: right;" | 58,156
| style="text-align: right;" |

All comparisons in vote share are to the corresponding 1988 election.

Ward results

Billericay East

Billericay West (2 seats)

Burstead

Fryerns Central

Fryerns East

Laindon

Langdon Hills

Lee Chapel North

Nethermayne

Pitsea East

Pitsea West

Vange

Wickford North

Wickford South

References

1992
1992 English local elections
1990s in Essex